Herşey Yolunda (Everything's Alright) is the third studio album by Turkish ska punk rock group Athena, released on January 12, 2002. The album was released through Universal Music in Turkey on January 12, 2002.

Track listing 
Lyrics for all songs are in the Turkish language, with Topukla being the only instrumental piece.

Compact disc version 
 "Yavaş Yavaş" (Slowly) - 3:48
 "Bak Takılmana" (Chill out) - 3:33
 "Öpücük" (Kiss) - 3:31
 "Sen de Yap" (Do it) - 3:30
 "Yorulmak Olmaz" (No Fatigue) - 5:02
 "Fık Fık" - 4:39
 "Beyoğlu" - 3:14
 "Topukla" (Heels) - 2:57

References 

2002 albums